Rémi Marcoux,  (born July 6, 1940) is the founder and controlling shareholder of Transcontinental, Inc. Based in Montreal, Transcontinental is Canada's largest printing company and is a publisher of magazines and French language educational materials.

Honours
In 2006, he was made a member of the Order of Canada. In 2008, he was made an Officer of the National Order of Quebec. He was inducted into the Academy of Great Montrealers in the Economic category in 2008 and was named a Commander of the Order of Montreal in 2016.

References

1940 births
Canadian magazine publishers (people)
Living people
Members of the Order of Canada
Officers of the National Order of Quebec
People from Montreal